Matinée idol is a term used mainly to describe film or theatre stars who are adored to the point of adulation by their fans. The term almost exclusively refers to adult male actors.

Matinée idols often tend to play romantic and dramatic leading or secondary leading roles and are usually known for having good looks. The term can be taken as faintly pejorative in that it suggests the star's popularity came from the afternoon matinée performances, frequented more by women, rather than the "big picture" evenings and, hence, a less discriminating audience. Matinée idols often became the subject of parody during the height of their popularity, an example being Stan Laurel spoofing Rudolph Valentino in his film Mud and Sand.

Now a somewhat old-fashioned term, the phenomenon reached its height from the 1920s to around the 1960s in Hollywood. "Teen idol" is a similar term, which more often refers to youthful musicians rather than film actors. In today's Asia “idols” pertain to a broader pop culture.

The term differs from "sex symbol", which refers to a star's sexual attractiveness in and outside of film more so than their romantic performances on the screen. However, a sex symbol may also be a matinée idol.

In Eugene O'Neill’s autobiographical play Long Day's Journey into Night, there is a speech where the character of the mother describes how as a convent-educated schoolgirl she became enamored with the dashing matinee idol modeled after O’Neill’s popular father.

Famous matinée idols

1910s–1920s
Matinée idols during this time were commonly referred to simply as "lovers". "Latin lovers", or actors who specialized in characters of Latin American or Romance European descent, became popular in the 1920s after Rudolph Valentino's famous performance as Julio Desnoyers in The Four Horsemen of the Apocalypse (1921). Other Latin lovers include Ramon Novarro, Antonio Moreno and Ricardo Cortez, although the latter was actually a Jew named Jacob Krantz who passed as Latin to capitalize on the trope's popularity.

Harold Lockwood
Sessue Hayakawa (first Asian idol to become popular in America)
Antonio Moreno
Wallace Reid
Richard Barthelmess
Thomas Meighan
Richard Dix
Douglas Fairbanks
Ramon Novarro
Rudolph Valentino
Ivor Novello
Reginald Denny
Adolphe Menjou
John Gilbert
Ronald Colman
Francis X. Bushman
Ricardo Cortez
Charles de Rochefort
William Haines

1930s

Errol Flynn
Clark Gable
Lew Ayres
Robert Taylor

1940s

 Van Johnson
Richard Greene
Tyrone Power
Peter Lawford
Montgomery Clift
Turhan Bey
Guy Madison

1950s

Dilip Kumar
Anthony Perkins
Dirk Bogarde
Rock Hudson
Tab Hunter
Tony Curtis
Jaggayya
Sivaji Ganesan
Akkineni Nageswara Rao 
N. T. Rama Rao
M. G. Ramachandran
Pat Boone
Prem Nazir
Ricardo Montalbán
Robert Wagner

1960s

Bobby Rydell
David Janssen
Fabian
Frankie Avalon
Gardner McKay
Laurence Harvey
Lito Legaspi
Robert Redford
Troy Donahue

1970s

Dr. Rajkumar
Amitabh Bachchan
Rajesh Khanna
Soumitra Chatterjee
Rishi Kapoor
Shashi Kapoor
Sanjeev Kumar
Rajnikanth
Kamal Haasan
Hema Malini
Zeenat Aman
Sharmila Tagore
Lakshmi
Vishnuvardhan
Dustin Hoffman
Warren Beatty

1980s

Mithun Chakraborty
Richard Gere
Mammootty
Mohanlal
Sridevi
Vijayashanti
Rekha
Debasree Roy
Chiranjeevi
Tom Hanks

1990s

Shah Rukh Khan
Salman Khan
Prosenjit Chatterjee
Tom Cruise
Brad Pitt
Denzel Washington
Pierce Brosnan
Nagarjuna
Hugh Grant
Keanu Reeves
River Phoenix
Johnny Depp
Aamir Khan
Mahesh Babu

Sports
 Professional boxer Bobby Czyz, who fought and lost to Evander Holyfield, Mustafa Hamsho and Virgil Hill, was nicknamed "The Matinee Idol".
 During the November 15, 2009, Sunday Night Football game between the New England Patriots and the Indianapolis Colts, Bob Costas used the term to describe New England Patriots' superstar quarterback Tom Brady. The Colts went on to win by a score of 35–34.
 Professional boxer Oscar "Golden Boy" De La Hoya is also another fighter known as "Matinee Idol".
 Olympic athlete Johannes Klæbo was also referred to this way during the PyeongChang Winter Olympics in 2018.

References

Bibliography
 Williams, Michael. Ivor Novello: Screen Idol. BFI, 2003.

Acting
Celebrity
Film and video terminology